Pterocactus (from Greek pteron, "wing", referring to the saucer-shaped seed of these plants) is a genus of the cactus family (Cactaceae), comprising 9 species. All Pterocactus have tuberous roots and are endemic to South and Western Argentina. The genus has been given its own tribe, the Pterocacteae.

Species
Species of the genus Pterocactus according to Plants of the World Online :

References

 Edward F. Anderson, The Cactus Family (Timber Press, 2001), pp. 593–596

External links

Opuntioideae genera
Opuntioideae